The Hackers on Planet Earth (HOPE) conference series is a hacker convention sponsored by the security hacker magazine 2600: The Hacker Quarterly that until 2020 was typically held at Hotel Pennsylvania, in Manhattan, New York City. Occurring biennially in the summer, there have been fourteen conferences to date. HOPE 2020, originally planned to be held at St. John's University, was instead held as a nine-day virtual event from July 25 to August 2, 2020. The fourteenth HOPE, "A New HOPE," was held at St. John's University in Queens from July 22 to 24, 2022. HOPE features talks, workshops, demonstrations, tours, and movie screenings.

HOPE was significantly inspired by the quadrennial Hack-Tic events in the Netherlands which also inspired the annual Chaos Communication Congress (C3) held in Germany. Summercon was also an influential predecessor.

Structure 
HOPE has been held at Hotel Pennsylvania in New York City every time except once since 1994. The event is always structured in a similar way. It consists of three days and three nights of activities, including talks, workshops, and performances. It also features hackerspace villages, a film festival, lock picking villages, a wide variety of vendors, art installations, live video, vintage computers, robots, an amateur/ham radio station, electronics workshops, and book signings.

The closing ceremony is a regular part of the event, celebrating the event, the organizers, and volunteers, but also features performances. Since 2006, monochrom's Johannes Grenzfurthner is a regular performer at the closing ceremony.

Conferences

HOPE: Hackers on Planet Earth 
Held August 13–14, 1994 at the Hotel Pennsylvania, the first HOPE conference marked 2600: The Hacker Quarterly'''s 10th anniversary. Over 1,000 people attended, including speakers from around the world. Access to a 28.8 kbit/s local network was provided. This conference was visited and covered in the second episode of the "Your Radio Playhouse" show, later renamed This American Life.

 Beyond HOPE 
The August 8–10, 1997 Beyond HOPE conference was held at the Puck Building, in Manhattan, New York City. Attendance doubled, with 2,000 attendees. Bell Technology Group helped to support the hackers. The hacker group L0pht Heavy Industries presented a panel discussion that covered some of their recent projects, accomplishments, emerging trends and shortcomings in technologies, and a deep dive into Windows NT password internals. A TAP reunion and a recorded live broadcast of Off the Hook took place. 
A 10 Mbit/s local network was provided to attendees.

 H2K 
The July 14–15, 2000 HOPE returned to the Hotel Pennsylvania, where subsequent conferences have been held. The conference ran 24 hours a day, bringing in 2,300 attendees. Jello Biafra gave a keynote speech. In a cultural exchange between the punk rock icon/free speech activist and the hacker community, Jello drew connections between the two communities, despite his lack of computer experience. The EFF also raised thousands of dollars. The conference provided a working Ethernet and a T1 link to the internet.

 H2K2 
H2K2, July 12–14, 2002, had a theme focused on U.S. Homeland Security Advisory System. H2K2 included two tracks of scheduled speakers, with a third track reserved for last-minute and self-scheduled speakers, a movie room, retrocomputing, musical performances, a State of the World Address by Jello Biafra, keynotes by Aaron McGruder and Siva Vaidhyanathan and discussions on the DMCA and DeCSS. Freedom Downtime premiered on Friday evening (July 14). The conference provided wireless 802.11b coverage and wired Ethernet, an open computer area for access to a 24-hour link to the Internet at "T-1ish" speeds, made available by the DataHaven Project and an internal network.

 The Fifth HOPE 
The Fifth HOPE, July 9–11, 2004, had a theme on propaganda, and commemorated the anniversaries of both the H.O.P.E. conferences and Off the Hook (with a live broadcast of the show from the conference, Beyond H.O.P.E.). Keynotes speakers were Kevin Mitnick, Steve Wozniak, and Jello Biafra. There was also a presentation by "members" of the Phone Losers of America who celebrated their tenth anniversary. The Cult of the Dead Cow hacker collective celebrated its twentieth anniversary at the conference. The conference provided access to a four-layer public network with two T1 lines, plus backup links to the internet via a public terminal cluster, various wired connections, a WiFi network on three floors and a video network.

HOPE Number Six

HOPE Number Six, July 21–23, 2006, included talks from Richard Stallman and Jello Biafra. 
Kevin Mitnick was scheduled to be at the conference but was unable to appear:  while on vacation in Colombia an illness prevented his timely return to the U.S. HOPE Number Six had a 100-megabit Internet connection; the conference organizers claimed it was the fastest Internet connection to-date at any U.S. hacker conference. The event's theme was based on the number six and The Prisoner (a designation shared by the titular "prisoner,").
Notable occurrences:
 Steve Rambam, a private investigator heading Pallorium, Inc., an online investigative service, was scheduled to lead a panel discussion titled "Privacy is Dead... Get Over It." A few minutes before the start of the panel, Rambam was arrested by the FBI on charges that he unlawfully interfered with an ongoing case Federal prosecutors filed against Albert Santoro, a former Brooklyn assistant New York district attorney indicted in January 2003 on a count of money-laundering. The charges were eventually dropped and the talk was subsequently held in November 2006, long after the conference.
 Jello Biafra began his talk by referring to the arrest of Steve Rambam, noting the convention had been more "spook heavy" than usual. He then announced a "special message" to "any Federal agents that may be in the audience", and mooned the convention.

 The Last HOPE 
The "Last HOPE" took place July 18–20, 2008 at the Hotel Pennsylvania. A change from past years was the use of an Internet forum to facilitate community participation in the planning of the event.

The conference name referred to the expectation that this would be the final H.O.P.E. conference due to the scheduled demolition of its venue, the Hotel Pennsylvania. The Save Hotel Pennsylvania Foundation was created to work toward keeping the building from being demolished by its then-new owner, Vornado Realty Trust.
The "Next HOPE" was scheduled for Summer 2010. At the closing ceremony it was revealed that the use of the word "last" could also refer to the previous event, or one that had ended (referring to The Last HOPE itself).

Steven Levy gave the keynote address. Kevin Mitnick, Steve Rambam, Jello Biafra, and Adam Savage of MythBusters were featured speakers.  Descriptions and audio of the talks can be found at thelasthope.org

 The Next HOPE 
The 8th HOPE convention, "The Next HOPE", took place on July 16–18, 2010. The Next HOPE was held at the Hotel Pennsylvania, as the plans by Vornado to demolish the hotel are on hold.

 HOPE Number Nine 
HOPE Number Nine occurred July 13–15, 2012 at Hotel Pennsylvania in Manhattan.

Keynote presentations for HOPE Number Nine were given by The Yes Men (with Andy Bichelbaum as principal speaker and Vermin Supreme also participating) and NSA whistleblower William Binney. Chris Kubecka, principal speaker of a presentation about internet censorship was served a cease and desist letter in an attempt to censor the presentation by Unisys and threatened with termination for a presentation titled "The Internet is for Porn! How High Heels and Fishnet Have Driven Internet Innovation and Information Security". Unisys demanded all information regarding the presentation be removed from the internet, but the Streisand effect occurred, with the censorship attempt posted on thousands of websites instead.  A first for the conference, a ghost speaker @JK47theweapon had to deliver most of the presentation due to legal threats against Kubecka. Prior to beginning, the MC invited "any hangers on or associates of the law firm of Baker & McKenzie" to speak to the Electronic Frontier Foundation (EFF). Baker & McKenzie is the law firm of Unisys Netherlands which threatened to terminate its employee by letter for giving a presentation about internet censorship.

 HOPE X 

HOPE X took place from July 18–20, 2014 at Hotel Pennsylvania. The keynote speakers were Daniel Ellsberg and Edward Snowden; also featured was noted former NSA official and whistleblower Thomas Drake. The theme of the conference was "dissent", and whistle-blowing was a topic of a good number of talks. But the conference also featured critical talks about the state of hackdom, for example Johannes Grenzfurthner of monochrom spoke about the problems of rockstar martyrdom'' within the hacker scene and the creation of hacker cult figures (like Snowden, Appelbaum or Assange) by unreflective members of the community or the media.

Notable changes included a massive increase in available bandwidth. Previous conferences had a 50 Mbit connection; HOPE X had a 10 Gbit fibre optic connection provided by Hurricane Electric. This geometric increase in bandwidth made possible live streaming of all conference talks in real time. The Ellsberg/Snowden keynote was seen in over 120 countries. This also was the first year all conference areas were fully connected to the conference network, albeit with the Workshop floor with slightly limited connectivity (a 1 Gbit connection, as compared to the 10 Gbit backbone of the other conference spaces). Five different wireless networks were provided to conference attendees. The hammocks on the mezzanine level, which provided a place for some attendees to sleep if they were unable to procure a place to otherwise do so, were replaced by inflatable furniture in a dedicated "Chill Space" area. Mezzanine space was also explicitly dedicated to attendee meetups in the form of villages, similar to assemblies at Chaos Communication Congresses and villages at hacker camps, specifically "Village Zone A" (primarily a soldering and electronics workshop), "Village Zone B", "Lockpickers Village", and "Noisy Square". Workshop tracks were published in the schedule and the conference took nearly all the hotel's available meeting space.

HOPE XI 
HOPE XI (The Eleventh HOPE) took place from July 22–24, 2016 at Hotel Pennsylvania. Cory Doctorow was the keynote speaker. Like last time, HOPE XI was provided Internet transit by Hurricane Electric at 111 Eighth Avenue over a fiber connection leased from RCN Corporation. Aruba Networks sponsored 50 wireless access points which were used to provide 3 wireless networks for attendees, two of which were secured with either WPA or PSK, another network for the NOC, and one for the press and speakers.

Network connectivity was fully provided for in all areas, which came into use throughout the conference as many talks were filled to capacity and attendees either watched streams on their own devices or in designated overflow and viewing areas.

The Circle of HOPE (HOPE 12) 
The 12th HOPE conference, "The Circle of HOPE", occurred July 20–22, 2018. Speakers included Chelsea Manning, Barrett Brown, Richard Stallman, Jason Scott, Matt Blaze, Micah Lee, and Steve Rambam, among many others. The conference was marked by protests from alt-right activists.

HOPE 2020 
A conference was originally planned for July 31-August 2, 2020 at a new venue, St. John's University in Queens. Due to the COVID-19 pandemic it was changed to a nine-day virtual event from July 25 to August 2, 2020. In addition to a longer schedule for talks, most of the originally planned events will be streamed, including workshops and musical performances. Keynote speakers are Libby Liu of the Open Technology Fund (OTF), Flavio Aggio of the World Health Organization (WHO), Idalin Bobé of TechActivist.org, Tiffany Rad of Anatrope Inc, Yeshimabeit Milner of Data for Black Lives, Jaron Lanier, Cindy Cohn, Cory Doctorow, and Richard Thieme. Conference participants communicated primarily using the first year appearance of HOPE's own Matrix chat server.

2021 canceled plan 
An in-person HOPE conference was planned for summer 2021, breaking from the typical biennial conference interval, but was canceled due to the ongoing COVID-19 pandemic.

A New HOPE 
The 14th conference, A New Hope, is scheduled to occur at St. John's University in Queens, New York City from 22-24 July 2022.

See also 
 Chaos Communication Congress
 Chaos Communication Camp
 DEF CON
 ToorCon

References

External links 
 HOPE website

2600: The Hacker Quarterly
Hacker conventions
Hacker culture
Free-software events
Recurring events established in 1994
1994 establishments in New York City
Conventions in New York City